Conor Gormley (born 10 October 1980) is an Irish Gaelic footballer for the Carrickmore St Colmcille's club and the Tyrone county team. With his county, Gormley is a three-time All-Ireland Senior Football Championship winner and All Stars Award winner in 2003, 2005 and 2008.

As of 2021, gormley is still playing club football with carrickmore at the age of 41

Playing career

Club
Gormley plays his club football for Carrickmore St Colmcille's and has won four Tyrone Senior Championship medals with the club in 1999, 2001, 2004 and 2005.

Inter-county
Gormley has been one of the most consistent performers in a Tyrone jersey and was pivotal in the 2003, 2005 and 2008 All-Ireland winning Tyrone county teams.

His greatest moment in a Tyrone jersey came in the 2003 All-Ireland Senior Football Championship Final against Armagh. With two minutes remaining in the match, and Tyrone a vulnerable three points ahead, Steven McDonnell, who had already scored five goals in the Championship had picked up the ball in a very dangerous area, and was bearing down on goal. As he kicked the ball, Gormley made an outstanding diving block to prevent an almost certain goal.

In August 2006, Gormley suffered a double leg break in a club game. This ruled him out for the rest of the year, although he returned to action in 2007, and his performances earned him a Gaelic Players Association award.

Gormley made the Tyrone senior squad managed by Art McRory before he made the U-21 squad managed by current senior boss Mickey Harte.

Electrical work
Outside of football Gormley is an electrician by trade.

References

1980 births
Living people
Carrickmore St Colmcille's Gaelic footballers
Tyrone inter-county Gaelic footballers
Winners of three All-Ireland medals (Gaelic football)